Cortinarius sulfurinus is a species of fungus belonging to the family Cortinariaceae.

Synonym:
 Cortinarius sulfurinus var. sulfurinus Quél., 1884

References

Cortinariaceae